905 Universitas is an S-type asteroid orbiting in the Main belt as part of the Flora family. Its diameter is about 21 km and it has an albedo of 0.085. Its rotation period is approximately 14.2 hours.

References

External links 
 
 

000905
Discoveries by Friedrich Karl Arnold Schwassmann
Named minor planets
000905
19181030